Campbell Glacier is a glacier, about  long, originating near the south end of Mesa Range and draining southeast between the Deep Freeze Range and Mount Melbourne to discharge into north Terra Nova Bay. The lower end of the glacier was observed by the Northern Party, led by Lieutenant Victor Campbell, Royal Navy, of the British Antarctic Expedition, 1910–13; it was named for the leader of this party. The extent of the glacier and its discharge into north Terra Nova Bay, rather than the Nansen Ice Sheet, was determined by United States and New Zealand survey parties to the area in 1961–62 and 1962–63. The steep bluff along the east side of the glacier is known as Hades Terrace, Bier Point is a projecting headland on the eastern side of Campbell Glacier.

See also
Browning Pass - icy tie to adjacent glacier
Rebuff Glacier - tributary glacier
Suture Bench

References 

Glaciers of Scott Coast